Chapter 2: The Voice is the third studio album by American singer Syleena Johnson. It was released by Jive Records on November 26, 2002 in the United States. While Johnson reteamed with R. Kelly and Joel Kipnis to work on the album, Chapter 2 includes a diverse roster of collaborators including Hi-Tek, Dwayne Bastiany, Mike Dunn and Scorpio as well as duo Carvin & Ivan who contributed four songs. Upon its release, it debuted and peaked at number 104 on the US Billboard 200 and entered the top 20 on the Top R&B/Hip-Hop Albums chart. With "Tonight I'm Gonna Let Go", the album's lead single, Chapter 2 produced Johnson's first international top forty hit.

Release and promotion
The album's lead single "Tonight I'm Gonna Let Go" was released on August 5, 2002. The song, that samples on Busta Rhymes' Put Your Hands Where My Eyes Could See, was one of BET's most-played clips for the weeks of October 13, October 20 and October 27, 2002. The Voice's second single "Guess What" was written and produced by R. Kelly; it was sent to radios on October 28.

Track listing

Sampling credits
 "Tonight I'm Gonna Let Go" contains re-played elements from "Sweet Green Fields" by Seals and Crofts. 
 "If You Play Your Cards Right" is a cover of the 1981 song by Alicia Myers.
 "Tonight I'm Gonna Let Go (Remix)" samples on "Put Your Hands Where My Eyes Could See" by Busta Rhymes.

Personnel
Credits adapted from the album's liner notes.

 Kamel Abdo – Engineer
 Timmy Allen – Vocals (background)
 Ivan "Orthodox" Barias – Producer, Instrumentation
 Dwayne Bastiany – Producer, Instrumentation
 Jim Bottari – Engineer
 Kara Buhl – Photo Production
 C-Major – Producer
 Troy Corbin – Vocals (background)
 Mike Dunn – Producer, Engineer
 Rodney East – Keyboards
 David Flemming – Engineer
 Andy Gallas – Engineer
 Abel Garibaldi – Programming, Engineer
 Serban Ghenea – Mixing
 Tony Gillis – Mastering
 Tarsha Gray – Hair Stylist
 Carvin "Ransum" Haggins – Producer, Vocal Arrangement
 Hi-Tek – Producer
 Syleena Johnson – Arranger, Vocals (background), Vocal Arrangement

 Jamar Jones – Keyboards
 R. Kelly – Arranger, Vocals (background), Producer, Mixing, Remix Producer, Remix Arrangement
 Donnie Lyle – Bass, Guitar
 Carlos "Storm" Martinez – Engineer
 Charles McCrorey – Engineer
 Ian Mereness – Programming, Engineer, Mixing
 Jason Mlodzinski – Assistant
 Jackie Murphy – Art Direction, Design
 Herb Powers – Mastering
 Darien Rapp – Engineer
 Christian Robinson – Engineer
 Frank Romano – Guitar
 Patrick Salisbury – Photography
 Brian Stanley – Engineer
 Rich Tapper – Engineer
 Chris Trevett – Engineer
 Denise Trorman – Art Direction, Design
 Pamela Watson – Stylist
 Doug Wilson – Engineer

Charts

Weekly charts

Year-end charts

Release history

References

External links
 Official website

2002 albums
Albums produced by R. Kelly
Jive Records albums
Syleena Johnson albums